Greek National Road 17 (abbreviated as EO17) is a single carriageway road in northwestern Greece. It connects Ioannina with Dodoni, via Bizani.

Ioannina (regional unit)
17
Roads in Epirus (region)